Per Roar Bredvold (born 5 March 1957 in Elverum) is a Norwegian politician representing the Progress Party. He is currently a representative of Hedmark in the Storting and was first elected in 1997.

Storting committees
2001–2009 member of the Defence committee.
2005–2009 member of the Election committee.
2001–2005 reserve member of the Extended Foreign Affairs committee.
1997–2001 member of the Family, Culture and Administration committee.
1997–2001 member of the Election committee.

External links

 Fremskrittspartiet - Biography

1957 births
Living people
People from Elverum
Progress Party (Norway) politicians
Members of the Storting
21st-century Norwegian politicians
20th-century Norwegian politicians